The 21st People's Choice Awards, honoring the best in popular culture for 1994, were held on March 5, 1995, at Universal Studios Hollywood, in Universal City, California. They were hosted by Tim Daly and Annie Potts, and broadcast on CBS.

Ron Howard received a special award for his work in the motion picture and television industry.

Awards
Winners are listed first, in bold.

References

External links
1995 People's Choice.com

People's Choice Awards
1995 awards in the United States
People's Choice Awards
March 1995 events in the United States